Claret is a locality located in the municipality of Torà, in Province of Lleida province, Catalonia, Spain. As of 2020, it has a population of 7.

Geography 
Claret is located 97km east-northeast of Lleida.

References

Populated places in the Province of Lleida